Jasjit S. Suri is an American engineer who works in the fields of biomedical engineering, computer science and clinical engineering. His work is focused on the implementation of artificial intelligence in biomedicine, and healthcare.

Education and career 
Suri received a masters degree in computer sciences from the University of Illinois, Chicago. In 1997, he completed his PhD in electrical engineering at the University of Washington, Seattle.  He later went back to Weatherhead School of Management at Case Western Reserve University, completing an MBA in 2004.

He has been a fellow of the American Institute for Medical and Biological Engineering (AIMBE) since 2004, American Institute of Ultrasound in Medicine (AIUM), Asia Pacific Vascular Society (APVS), and the Institute of Electrical and Electronics Engineers (IEEE).

Suri is the chairperson of  AtheroPoint, a medical imaging company based in Roseville, CA.

References

External links 
 
 IEEE author bio

Living people
Year of birth missing (living people)
Electrical engineers
University of Illinois Chicago alumni
Fellow Members of the IEEE
University of Washington alumni